Tibau is the northernmost city in the Brazilian state of Rio Grande do Norte. It is also the last coastal city (going east-west) of that state before Ceará. One of the main sources of income for the city is within the fishing and farming industry.

References 

Populated coastal places in Rio Grande do Norte
Populated places established in 1997
Municipalities in Rio Grande do Norte